Passy is a commune in the Yonne department in Bourgogne-Franche-Comté in north-central France.

Geography 
The altitude of the village of Passy is of approximately 95 meters. The surface of Passy is 5.74 square kilometers. The latitude and longitude of Passy are 48.109 degrees North and 3.304 degrees East. Towns in the vicinity of Passy are :

Population 
The population of Passy was 304 inhabitants in 2007, a very small increase compared to 1999 ( 301 ). There were 223 inhabitants in 1990, 197 inhabitants in 1982, 219 inhabitants in 1975 and 169 inhabitants in 1968.

See also
Communes of the Yonne department

References

Communes of Yonne